The Conemaugh Formation is a geologic formation in Pennsylvania. It preserves fossils dating back to the Carboniferous period.

See also

 List of fossiliferous stratigraphic units in Pennsylvania
 Paleontology in Pennsylvania

References
 

Carboniferous geology of Pennsylvania
Carboniferous southern paleotropical deposits